is a Japanese singer, actress, and presenter. She is a member of the girl group Hinatazaka46.

Kageyama frequently appears in media related to football and was the Japan Ambassador for the football video game FIFA 22. She made her acting debut in the series Re:Mind (2017) and her first film appearance was in Kaguya-sama Final: Love Is War (2021).

Career

2015–2018: Early career, acting debut 
In 2015, Kageyama took part in the second AKB48 Group Draft Conference, a joint audition between AKB48 and its Japan-based sister groups. She advanced to the final round, but was not selected to become a trainee.

 On May 8, 2016, the same day as her fifteenth birthday, Kageyama passed the audition for Hiragana Keyakizaka46 and joined Neru Nagahama as a first generation member of the group. She was introduced to the public on May 11. Within the group, Kageyama is noted for her abilities in both academics and sports, which are often shown in her television appearances, in addition to her singing skills.

 In 2017, Kageyama made her acting debut in the Hiragana Keyakizaka46 drama Re:Mind, aired on TV Tokyo and Netflix. Real Sound praised her "impactful" performance as the hidden mastermind, her insane nature "flickering" as she calmly explains her plan during the reveal.

2018–2020: Academic hiatus 
On June 1, 2018, Kageyama announced that she was going into hiatus to prepare for the University of Tokyo entrance examinations. During her hiatus, she won a bronze medal in the 2018 Japan Philosophy and Ethics Grand Prix.

In March 2019, Hiragana Keyakizaka46 was rebranded into Hinatazaka46. Kageyama did not appear in Hinatazaka46's first four singles; her first appearance in a Hinatazaka46 music release was in the 2020 album Hinatazaka. However, she did make surprise appearances at the final concert of the 2018 Hashiridasu Shunkan Tour and in the group's 2019 photobook, Tachikogi. She resumed entertainment activities on May 26, 2020 with a post on her official blog.

2020–present: Football-related appearances, feature film debut 
Kageyama is an association football enthusiast and played regularly in a local boys' team before joining Hiragana Keyakizaka46. Her catchphrases include  and  She holds a Class 4 referee qualification and regularly writes about the Japanese league on her blog in a series titled "Yūka Kageyama's WE LOVE J.League", which aims to cover all 56 teams from all three league divisions. Her favorite teams include Sanfrecce Hiroshima, Borussia Dortmund, and Leeds United F.C.

Kageyama became a recurring guest in the TV Tokyo football talk show  and Atsuto Uchida's Football Time on DAZN, and was appointed Special Analyst for FOOT×BRAIN in October thanks to her knowledge in football strategy. Former Japan national football team player Tsuyoshi Kitazawa named her the "number one football enthusiast in the idol world". In December, Kageyama co-hosted her first self-titled football talk show miniseries on Hikari TV Channel with former Japan national team captain Yuji Nakazawa, which was titled Yuji Nakazawa and Yūka Kageyama's Talking Football in English and ran for three episodes.

Kageyama appeared in her first voice acting role as Ayame Ebina in the animated adaptation of the football manga Farewell, My Dear Cramer (2021) on Tokyo MX, and also served as the production's "support manager". She made her first feature film appearance in Kaguya-sama Final: Love Is War, co-starring Kanna Hashimoto and released on August 20. Early in her career, Kageyama had named Hashimoto and actress Erika Toda as the people she admired. Real Sound positively commented on her "funny expressions" and that her intelligent image matched that of her character, Miko Iino.

Kageyama and fellow Hinatazaka46 members Mei Higashimura and Konoka Matsuda were appointed support ambassadors for DAZN's AFC Asian Cup Qualifications "Road to Qatar" campaign, which ran from August 2021 to March 2022. Kageyama also produced football educational video content for the campaign. In September 2021, Kageyama was appointed the Japan Ambassador for the football simulation video game FIFA 22. She had previously participated in the promotion of FIFA 21, including as an ambassador for the J Club FIFA 21 Festival. On November 25, 2021, Kageyama, comedian Hiroyuki Yabe, and announcer  served as the hosts for the 2021 J. League awards. In May 2022, Kageyama became a co-host for the pre-2022 FIFA World Cup talk show FIFA World Cup 64, co-produced by TV Asahi and Abema, and went on to serve as co-host for several live match broadcasts of the event where she was noted for her game analysis and multiple accurate predictions, which earned her the moniker "Goddess of Victory". She placed fourth on the top ten list of rising female talents of the first half of 2022 according to Talent Power Ranking, published in July and attributed to her increasing appearances on football and quiz shows. In January 2023, she placed second on an advertising industry polling of female talents predicted to make a breakthrough that year.

Aside from football, Kageyama was appointed the "fair character" (endorser) for the twentieth anniversary fair of book publisher Kobunsha's  product line in October 2021. Fellow Hinatazaka46 member Manamo Miyata would also participate in the "Kobunsha Classics" fifteenth anniversary fair. As a philomath, she revealed in 2022 that she had obtained qualifications in several fields, including , news and current affairs, real estate, pharmaceuticals, dental assistant, and psychological counselor.

On February 17, 2023, Kageyama announced that she would leave Hinatazaka46 after promotions for the group's ninth single has concluded, due to a persistent hearing disorder. Her photobook, to be published by Fusosha, has been scheduled for release on May 9.

Personal life 
Kageyama described her family as "football lovers" and they used to go overseas to support the Japan national team when she was younger. Her mother also holds a referee qualification, while her younger brother Shūto is a forward for the Kokushikan University football team. The family owns a Chihuahua named Chico. 

Kageyama graduated from Tsukuba University High School. As a student, she was a member of the quiz research club and organized quiz events for middle school students, some of whom participated in the 42nd All Japan High School Quiz Championship where she served as an observer in 2022. 

In January 2023, Kageyama announced that she has joined the Japan chapter of Mensa International.

Discography 

Kageyama has participated in Hinatazaka46 title songs since "Kimi Shika Katan" (2021), as well as the all-member and first generation songs by Hiragana Keyakizaka46 until the album Hashiridasu Shunkan (2018) and by Hinatazaka46 since the album Hinatazaka (2020). Prominent appearances include:

 "Hiragana Keyaki" ("Sekai ni wa Ai Shika Nai" B-side, 2016), first appearance in a music release
 "Natsuiro no Mule" (Hashiridasu Shunkan, 2018), as a quartet with Mao Iguchi, Mana Takase, and Mei Higashimura
 "Sonota Ōzei Type" ("Tsuki to Hoshi ga Odoru Midnight" B-side, 2022), with Suzuka Tomita, Miku Kanemura, and Hinano Kamimura

Videography

Video albums

Filmography

Feature film

Television series

Variety and talk shows

Radio

Events

Notes

References

External links 
  

2001 births
Living people
Actresses from Tokyo
21st-century Japanese actresses
Hinatazaka46 members
Japanese female idols
Japanese film actresses
Singers from Tokyo
Mensans